{{Infobox settlement
| name                   = 
| image_skyline          = Jeepney stop Gubat.jpg
| image_caption          = Downtown area
| image_flag             = Flag_of_Gubat,_Sorsogon.png
| flag_size              = 120x80px
| image_seal             = Gubat Sorsogon.png
| seal_size              = 100x80px
| image_map              = 
| map_caption            = 
| image_map1             = 
| pushpin_map            = Philippines
| pushpin_label_position = right
| pushpin_map_caption    = Location within the 
| coordinates            = 
| settlement_type        = 
| subdivision_type       = Country
| subdivision_name       = Philippines
| subdivision_type1      = Region
| subdivision_name1      = 
| subdivision_type2      = Province
| subdivision_name2      = 
| official_name          = 
| etymology              =  
| named_for              =  
| native_name            =
| other_name             =
| nickname               = 
| motto                  = Gubat is for Life
| anthem                 =
| subdivision_type3      = District
| subdivision_name3      = 
| established_title      = Founded
| established_date       = June 13, 1764
| parts_type             = Barangays
| parts_style            = para
| p1                     =   (see Barangays)
| leader_title           =  
| leader_name            =  Sharon Rose G. Escoto
| leader_title1          = Vice Mayor
| leader_name1           = Sixto F. Estareja
| leader_title2          = Representative 
| leader_name2           = Vacant
| leader_title3          = Municipal Council
| leader_name3           = 
| leader_title4          = Electorate 
| leader_name4           =  voters
| government_type        = 
| government_footnotes   = 
| elevation_m            = 
| elevation_max_m        = 93
| elevation_min_m        = 0
| elevation_max_rank     =
| elevation_min_rank     =
| elevation_footnotes    = 
| elevation_max_footnotes= 
| elevation_min_footnotes= 
| area_rank              =
| area_footnotes         = 
| area_total_km2         = 
| population_footnotes   = 
| population_total       = 
| population_as_of       = 
| population_density_km2 = auto
| population_blank1_title= Households
| population_blank1      =  
| population_blank2_title= 
| population_blank2      = 
| population_demonym     = Gubatnons
| population_rank        =
| population_note        =
| timezone               = PST
| utc_offset             = +8
| postal_code_type       = ZIP code
| postal_code            = 
| postal2_code_type      = 
| postal2_code           = 
| area_code_type         = 
| area_code              = 
| website                = 
| demographics_type1     = Economy
| demographics1_title1   = 
| demographics1_info1    = 
| demographics1_title2   = Poverty incidence
| demographics1_info2    = %
| demographics1_title3   = Revenue
| demographics1_info3    =   
| demographics1_title4   = Revenue rank
| demographics1_info4    = 
| demographics1_title5   = Assets
| demographics1_info5    =   
| demographics1_title6   = Assets rank
| demographics1_info6    = 
| demographics1_title7   = IRA
| demographics1_info7    =  
| demographics1_title8   = IRA rank
| demographics1_info8    = 
| demographics1_title9   = Expenditure
| demographics1_info9    =   
| demographics1_title10  = Liabilities
| demographics1_info10   =  
| demographics_type2     = Service provider 
| demographics2_title1   = Electricity
| demographics2_info1    = 
| demographics2_title2   = Water
| demographics2_info2    =  
| demographics2_title3   = Telecommunications
| demographics2_info3    = 
| demographics2_title4   = Cable TV
| demographics2_info4    =
| demographics2_title5   = 
| demographics2_info5    =
| demographics2_title6   = 
| demographics2_info6    =
| demographics2_title7   = 
| demographics2_info7    =
| demographics2_title8   = 
| demographics2_info8    =
| demographics2_title9   = 
| demographics2_info9    =
| demographics2_title10  = 
| demographics2_info10   =
| blank_name_sec1        = 
| blank_info_sec1        = 
| blank1_name_sec1       = Native languages
| blank1_info_sec1       = 
| blank2_name_sec1       = Crime index
| blank2_info_sec1       = 
| blank3_name_sec1       = 
| blank3_info_sec1       = 
| blank4_name_sec1       = 
| blank4_info_sec1       = 
| blank5_name_sec1       = 
| blank5_info_sec1       = 
| blank6_name_sec1       = 
| blank6_info_sec1       = 
| blank7_name_sec1       = 
| blank7_info_sec1       = 
| blank1_name_sec2       = Major religions
| blank1_info_sec2       = 
| blank2_name_sec2       = Feast date
| blank2_info_sec2       = 
| blank3_name_sec2       = Catholic diocese
| blank3_info_sec2       =
| blank4_name_sec2       = Patron saint 
| blank4_info_sec2       = 
| blank5_name_sec2       = 
| blank5_info_sec2       = 
| blank6_name_sec2       = 
| blank6_info_sec2       = 
| blank7_name_sec2       = 
| blank7_info_sec2       =
| short_description      =
| footnotes              =
}}

Gubat, officially the Municipality of Gubat (Gubatnon: Bungto san Gubat;), is a 2nd class municipality in the province of Sorsogon, Philippines. According to the 2020 census, it has a population of 60,294 people.

Gubat is pronounced with the accent on the second syllable. The people who live here speak the Gubat language which is also a dialect of Waray-Waray of Eastern Visayas, a Southern Sorsoganon sub-language and they were called Gubatnons.

History

Gubat was originally a big barrio of Bulusan, inhabited by a few Tagalogs, Visayans and Albayanons who travelled on foot to hunt wild animals. These people built their homes close to the shore and called their location Buri, which today is the barrio of Buenavista. In 1764, Gubat finally became a town with Don Pedro Manook, the first Teniente del Barrio, also becoming the first gobernadorcillo. The town proper is named after Don Pedro Manook.

The word "gúbat" means forest in Tagalog. However, the name applied to the town is derived from the verb "guinobat", a term used by the natives which means "raided". In the early days when Christians and Muslims were constantly at odds, Muslim pirates would come in from the southern seas to raid the town. Because of the frequent raids, the town was referred to as "guinobat" which eventually became "Gubat''". Legend has it that during one of those raids, the pastor along with the townspeople held up a statue of St. Anthony to ward off the attack, praying for a miracle. In one account, it was said that the child Jesus in St. Anthony's arms drove back the pirates. St. Anthony of Padua became the town's patron saint, and his feast day is lavishly celebrated as an official parish and town holiday every 13 June.

The town settlers had to move a number of times before finally deciding to settle at a place they considered safe and peaceful. Eventually, they began to expand, laying out permanent streets, the first of which are what we now know as Luna and Calderon Streets.

The main parish church itself has an interesting history. In 1768, the people decided to build a church. The locals, being poor, urged the town captain, Don Juan Bonifacio, to require all men to contribute one cubic meter of "talaksan" (coral stone) apiece. It took ten years of preparation, and it was not until 1778 that construction finally started.

Although it has since undergone several renovations, the church foundation is still the original one built in 1778. The rectory is the oldest and one of the only two remaining rectories dating back that far in the entire Bicol region.

In November 2006, Gubat became the site of a scientific expedition by astronomers Dr. Armando Lee, Bamm Gabriana, and Rochelle Derilo to observe the rare Mercury transit. Gubat was the best town in Luzon to observe the event.

Geography
Gubat is in the south-eastern part of Luzon Island, along the coast of the Pacific Ocean on the Bicol Peninsula. It is the third largest town in the province of Sorsogon. It is divided into 2 districts: the North District and South District.

Barangays
Gubat is politically subdivided into 42 barangays.

Barangays with (Poblacion) indicate that barangay is part of the town proper or poblacion

Climate

Demographics

Religions
Although, the dominant religion is Roman Catholicism, there are Gubatnons devoted to:
Iglesia ni Cristo
Protestant Evangelical Baptist
Islam (some traders and residents)
Buddhism (Chinese traders and residents)
Members Church of God International
 The Church of Jesus Christ of Latter-Day Saints
 Seventh Day Adventist
 Baptist

Economy

The main livelihoods of the people, then and now, are agriculture and fishing. Harvest times for rice crops are from April to May, and December. Fishing is year-round. Forestry products are also source of income here.

Transportation

Gubat can be reached mostly through land transport from Manila by bus, taking about 12 hours. There are several bus companies that operates daily from Manila to Gubat and vice versa: Alps The Bus Inc., JVH Transport/Pamar, Elavil Tours Phils. Inc., Raymond Transportation, St.Jude Transit, CUL Transport, DLTBCo., Penafrancia Tours/RSL/Isarog and Philtranco.

There are also jeepneys that provide transportation to Sorsogon City, Bulusan, Barcelona, Prieto-Diaz, Casiguran, Irosin and local barangays like Tigkiw, Bentuco and Benguet. Local tricycles travel to the innermost barangays like Union, Bulacao, Rizal, Cabigaan and Sangat.

Communications
The town has modern and efficient communications facilities including cellular mobile phones. 
Sun Cellular
Globe LTE
Smart 3G

Telephone Companies 
PLDT
Digitel

Cable TV

ANH Cable TV
DCTV Cable With Broadband
 
Satellite Cables

Cignal 
G Sat 
Dream Satellite 
Sky Direct

Radio Stations
DWPS FM 91.1 mHz "Rainbow Radio"
Padaba (Gubat) 105.1 mHz

Sports

Gubat is slowly being recognized as the only beginner friendly surfing spot in the province of Sorsogon. The sand bottom beach breaks of Barangays Ariman and Buenavista (Dangkalan and Rizal Beach) produce 2 to 5 feet waves from September to May. With the formation of Gubat Bay Surfers by Bidge Villarroya and surfboards donated by the Local Government Unit under Mayor Ding Ramos, surfing is more accessible to the local population and tourists alike. The new group of Gubat Sorsogon Surfer's Association, still under Bidge Villarroya is now performing well in the National Surf Competition Scene, winning 5 national surf championships and numerous finalist positions. Gubat is the Top 1 in Ngo Sport Airsoft Society by the NGO Bicol Sorsogon Chapter.

Festivals
The town celebrates its Ginubat Festival annually every June 1–13 in honor of its patron, St. Anthony of Padua. It is also the foundation of the town.

Education

Primary education
Includes:

Secondary education
Includes:
St. Louise De Marillac College of Sorsogon - St. Anthony Gubat Campus (formerly: St. Anthony Academy)
Gubat National High School
Landmark Baptist Academy
Bagacay National High School
Bentuco National High School
Bulacao National High School
Jupi National High School
Rizal National High School

Tertiary education
Bicol University (Gubat Campus)
Data Base Technology Computer School

References

External links

 Gubat Profile at PhilAtlas.com
 Municipality of Gubat official government website
 [ Philippine Standard Geographic Code]
 Philippine Census Information
 Local Governance Performance Management System 

Gubat, Sorsogon